Fatima Mohammed Bernawi (1939 – 3 November 2022) (also transliterated Barnawi) was an Afro-Palestinian, who was involved in the Palestinian Freedom Movement of the mid-1960s, a significant period of the Israeli–Palestinian conflict. She was known as the first Palestinian woman to have organized an operation in Israel—the attempted bombing of a movie theatre in October 1967.

Background and early life 
Bernawi was born in Jerusalem in 1939. At the age of nine, during the 1948 Nakba, her mother who is of Palestinian descent moved their family from Jerusalem to a refugee camp near Amman. However, they later returned to Palestine to her Nigerian father, who had fought in the 1936 Palestine revolt, and who had remained behind.

Bernawi worked as a practical nurse for the Arab-American Oil Company in Saudi Arabia (ARAMCO) but was not allowed to give shots to patients because of the colour of her skin, despite her Palestinian nationality.

Political life 
Of thirty-four Palestinian women whom Amal Kawar interviewed for her study Daughters of Palestine, Bernawi was one of only four who joined the resistance movement initially as a guerrilla fighter before becoming a political resistor. The others were Laila Khaled, Eisheh Odeh, and Rasmiyeh Odeh.

Attempted bombing and arrest 
The attempted bombing incident occurred in October 1967 at the Zion Cinema in Jewish West Jerusalem. Bernawi said the bomb's civilian target was chosen in protest of a film that celebrated the Six Day War. The bomb failed to explode and she was arrested by Israeli soldiers for the attempt. Bernawi claimed her skin colour was a factor in her arrest, saying, "Of course, they arrested all the young women from African origin."

Though sentenced to life in prison, Bernawi was released in a prisoner exchange in 1977 after having served 10 years. She was deported, but returned to the political party Fatah, later serving as the first female chief of the Palestinian Female Police Corps in Gaza. Later on, she married a former prisoner from Acre, Fawzi al-Nimr, who was released in May 1985.

By 1996, she was "the highest ranking female in Fateh militia and... head of the women's section of the police in the Palestinian self-rule government in the Gaza Strip and Jericho". Yasser Arafat, noted leader of Fateh and Chairman of the Palestinian Liberation Organization (PLO), held her in high regard, once saying that "if he would marry anyone it would be [Fatima] Bernawi".

On 28 May 2015, Bernawi was honoured by Palestinian Authority Chairman Mahmoud Abbas with the Military Star of Honor "out of appreciation for her pioneering role in the struggle" and "for the public good." Though the bombing she was honoured for was a failure, Bernawi insisted it was successful, saying, "This is not a failure, because it generated fear throughout the world. Every woman who carries a bag needs to be checked before she enters the supermarket, any place, cinemas and pharmacies." Bernawi was also honoured alongside Mahmoud Bakr Hijazi and Ahmad Moussa Salama in honour of Palestinian Prisoner's Day, 17 April 2015. She was described as "one of the first Palestinian women to adopt [the means of] armed self-sacrifice operations after the start of the modern Palestinian revolution, which was launched by Fatah on 1 January 1965. She was the first young Palestinian woman to be arrested by the Israeli security forces, and is the first woman prisoner listed in the records of the [Palestinian] women prisoners' movement..."

Death in Egypt 
On 3 November 2022, Bernawi died at "Palestine hospital" in Cairo, aged 83, and was later buried in Gaza City on 6 November.

References 

1939 births
2022 deaths
Palestinian militants
Palestinian women in politics
Palestinian nationalists
Fatah members
People from Jerusalem
Palestinian people of Nigerian descent
Women in 20th-century warfare
Women in war in the Middle East